Melissa Palma Julie Tancredi (born December 27, 1981) is a Canadian retired soccer forward who played for the Canada women's national soccer team. 3 time Olympian, 2 time Bronze Medalist.  She won an Olympic bronze medal as a participating member of Canada's national team at the 2012 Olympics when Canada defeated France 1–0 in the bronze medal match on August 9, 2012. Tancredi was a participating member when Canada won Bronze defeating Brazil 2-1 in the 2016 Rio Olympics.  Tancredi's nickname is "Tanc".

Early life
Tancredi was born in Ancaster, Ontario, to parents Peter and Ann-Marie Tancredi, her father being Italian-born from Ascoli Piceno. She began playing soccer at age four. She played soccer, volleyball, and track at Cathedral High School in Hamilton, Ontario. She was named soccer MVP and senior athlete of the year during her senior year.

Tancredi played for the under-19 provincial team and Burlington Sting club program. She helped the Burlington Sting win the Canadian title and Ontario Cup and was named the Most Valuable Player (MVP) of the Burlington Sting in 1999.

College
Tancredi attended the University of Notre Dame in the U.S. from 2000 to 2004 where she majored in anthropology and pre-medicine studies. She played on the school's soccer team, but she was sidelined her first year due to an anterior cruciate ligament injury.

In 2003, Tancredi was named First Team All-American, Second Team All-American, NSCAA Second Team All-Region, Big East Defensive Player of the Year, and First Team All-Big East Conference. She was a finalist for the MAC Hermann Trophy.

In 2004, Tancredi returned to Notre Dame after being awarded a fifth year of eligibility and was named as tri-captain. She helped lead the Irish to the NCAA National Championship and was named First Team All-American, Second Team All-American, First Team All-Big East, and Big East Defensive Player of the Year for a second straight season.

Playing career

Club
In 2004, Tancredi played with the Detroit Jaguars in the W-League, scoring two goals and providing two assists in ten games played. From 2005 to 2006, she played for the Atlanta Silverbacks Women in the W-League and was named to the 2005 W-League All-League team.

In 2009, Tancredi played for the Saint Louis Athletica in the Women's Professional Soccer league. In 2010, she joined the Vancouver Whitecaps FC in the W-League and led the team with six goals and two assists, The team was undefeated in the regular season and had a spot in the W-League's final four.

In 2011, Tancredi was a member of the Piteå IF in Sweden. In 2012, she played with the Swedish team Dalsjöfors GoIF. In 2014, she was allocated to the expansion Houston Dash by Canadian national team coach John Herdman, but was traded to the Chicago Red Stars for fellow Canadian international Erin McLeod before the Dash's expansion draft.

International
Tancredi was a member of the Canadian U19 national team and trained in British Columbia with the U20 national team in 2000. She was also a member of the 1999 national 'B' training team.

Tancredi made her debut with Canada as a central back, starting in all five games of the 2004 Olympic qualifying tournament in Costa Rica. Canada had 6–0 wins over Jamaica and Panama, two wins over Costa Rica (2–1, 4–0), and a 2–1 loss to Mexico that cost the Canadians a spot at the Olympic Games. Tancredi had previously been invited to play with the Canadian national team at the 2000 Algarve Cup in Portugal.

Tancredi was part of the Canadian team that finished second to the United States at the 2006 CONCACAF Women's Gold Cup. In 2007, Tancredi scored the second-fastest goal in World Cup history (just 37 seconds from the start of the September game against Australia) in her first game at the 2007 FIFA Women's World Cup in China.

Tancredi won a bronze medal at the 2007 Pan American Games. She played for 199 minutes (starting three games) at the 2011 FIFA Women's World Cup. She was part of the bronze medal-winning teams at the 2012 and 2016 Olympics, scoring four goals in the London games and two in the Rio games.

Matches and goals scored at World Cup and Olympic tournaments
Tancredi competed for team Canada in three World Cup final tournaments: 2007, 2011 and 2015; and three Olympics: Beijing 2008, London 2012, and Rio 2016. At these tournaments, she played in 24 matches and scored 8 goals. She and her teammates won bronze medals at both the London and Rio Olympics. Tancredi scored both goals in a 2–1 win against Germany on the third match day of the 2016 Rio Olympics to put Canada at the top of their group.

International goals

Personal life
Tancredi is openly lesbian. Tancredi announced her retirement from soccer in January 2017. She is now a Doctor of Chiropractic, practicing out of The Workshop Performance Clinic in Vancouver.

Honours
Canada

 Summer Olympic Games: Bronze Medal, 2016

References

Match reports

External links

Chicago Red Stars player profile
Notre Dame player profile

Living people
1981 births
Canadian expatriate sportspeople in the United States
Canadian expatriate women's soccer players
Canadian women's soccer players
Canada women's international soccer players
Footballers at the 2007 Pan American Games
Footballers at the 2008 Summer Olympics
Footballers at the 2012 Summer Olympics
Olympic soccer players of Canada
Notre Dame Fighting Irish women's soccer players
Saint Louis Athletica players
Soccer players from Hamilton, Ontario
Chicago Red Stars players
National Women's Soccer League players
Canadian people of Italian descent
2011 FIFA Women's World Cup players
2015 FIFA Women's World Cup players
USL W-League (1995–2015) players
Vancouver Whitecaps FC (women) players
Olympic medalists in football
Olympic bronze medalists for Canada
Dalsjöfors GoIF players
Damallsvenskan players
Medalists at the 2012 Summer Olympics
Medalists at the 2016 Summer Olympics
Canadian expatriate sportspeople in Sweden
Expatriate women's footballers in Sweden
Women's association football forwards
FIFA Century Club
Pan American Games bronze medalists for Canada
Footballers at the 2016 Summer Olympics
Lesbian sportswomen
LGBT association football players
Canadian LGBT sportspeople
Pan American Games medalists in football
Atlanta Silverbacks Women players
2007 FIFA Women's World Cup players
Medalists at the 2007 Pan American Games
Women's Professional Soccer players